The 2022 FIA Motorsport Games was the second edition of the FIA Motorsport Games. The event took place on 26–30 October 2022 with Marseille as a host city, and the Circuit Paul Ricard, Le Castellet as the venue for all the track-based disciplines. Scheduled initially for 23–25 October 2020, and later for 29–31 October 2021, the event was postponed two years in a row due to the COVID-19 pandemic. From this edition onwards, the FIA Motorsport Games will be held every two years, as opposed to an annual format.

Summary
All six disciplines from the 2019 edition returned, featuring GT3-spec cars, TCR Touring Car, Formula 4, drifting, karting slalom and eSports disciplines. The new additions included an individual sprint race for GT3-spec cars along the relay format, a rallying event for Rally 2, Rally 4 and historic cars, crosscars and karting for senior and junior classes, a karting endurance event and an auto slalom event with identical electric cars.

475 athletes (397 men and 78 women) from 72 National FIA member organisations will take part. 48 sets of medals will be featured in the 16 disciplines.

Events
On 11 March 2020, it was announced that the Motorsport Games would be expanded from 6 to 15 disciplines for its second edition. A new revision of the programme in January 2021 featured 18 disciplines, with the addition of an Endurance Cup for LMP3 machines and an Auto Slalom event, while the Karting Sprint Cup was split into two distinct age categories.

The Motorsport Games were finally rescheduled on 19 May 2022 with 17 disciplines, as the new Historic Regularity Rally event was taken off the programme. The Endurance Cup was expanded to include GT3 entries for 2022, but it was discontinued on a 7 October 2022 update, three weeks from the start of the event, despite entries having been already announced by nine competing countries. With that, the second edition of the Motorsport Games will feature 16 disciplines.

Teams

Athletes

Medal table

References

External links

 
2022
FIA Motorsport Games
FIA Motorsport Games
FIA Motorsport Games
FIA Motorsport Games
Sport in Marseille
International sports competitions hosted by France